Giovanni Maria Scorzuto (fl. 1620s) was an Italian composer and organist. He was maestro di cappella at the M. Comunità of Asola, Trevigiana, and had two pieces featured in Simonetti's collection Ghirlanda sacra, 1625.

17th-century Italian composers
Italian male composers
17th-century male musicians